(born October 24, 1975 as ) is a former sumo wrestler from Fuchu, Tokyo, Japan. His highest rank was jūryō 4. He was a member of the Tomozuna stable, and he was a tsukebito or personal attendant to ōzeki Kaiō for a number of years, as well as a frequent training partner of Sentoryū. He retired in 2006.

Career
As a child he played baseball. Kaidō went to Meiji Nakano High School where he was a year senior of Tochiazuma, and he was named the High School Yokozuna in 1990. He was an amateur sumo champion at Chuo University before making his professional debut in March 1998, at the bottom of the third highest makushita division as a makushita tsukedashi entrant.  He initially fought under the shikona of Tanaka, before changing to Kaito and then Kaidō (the character "Kai" being a common one in his stable or heya). He never made the top makuuchi division, but he spent 11 tournaments in the second highest jūryō division, which he first reached in 2003, reaching a high of jūryō 4. He was demoted to makushita in May 2005 and never made his way back. For many years he was a training partner to Sentoryū, as the two were the second and third most senior members of Tomozuna stable behind longtime ōzeki Kaiō. Kaidō served as Kaiō's tsukebito or personal assistant when he was in the lower ranks and credited his senior stablemate for encouraging him when he was struggling with injuries.

Retirement from sumo

He announced his retirement on August 18, 2006. He had been injury-prone throughout his career, suffering a number of knee injuries, although diabetes was the major factor in his decision. His danpatsu-shiki or official retirement ceremony was held in the Shinagawa Prince hotel in Takanawa, Tokyo on October 15, 2006. In 2007 he began running a yakiniku restaurant called "Sakigo" in Ogawamachi, Tokyo.

Fighting style
Kaidō's favourite techniques were hidari-yotsu, a right hand outside, left hand inside grip on the opponent's mawashi, and yori-kiri (force out). He also regularly used uwate-nage, or overarm throw, and like Kaiō was keen on arm grabs such as tottari and kote-nage.

Career record

See also
Glossary of sumo terms
List of past sumo wrestlers

References

External links
 
Kaido's basho results

1975 births
Living people
Japanese sumo wrestlers
People from Western Tokyo
Sumo people from Tokyo
Chuo University alumni